Valerie "Val" Vigoda is an American electric violinist and singer-songwriter. She is best known for writing and starring in musicals including Striking 12 and Ernest Shackleton Loves Me, the latter of which opened Off-Broadway in 2017, touring internationally with Cyndi Lauper, Joe Jackson, and the Trans-Siberian Orchestra, and for her one-woman concert "Just Getting Good" which has toured nationally.

Early life and influences 
Vigoda was admitted to Princeton University at the age of 14, withdrawing after one year to complete her classical violin training. She returned after a few years, graduating with honors and a degree in sociology.

Career 
Vigoda founded the musical trio GrooveLily in 1994, originally naming it The Valerie Vigoda Band, along with Brendan Milburn and Gene Lewin.

Vigoda has a one-woman show Just Getting Good in which she both sings and plays the six-string electric violin while utilizing live-looping. Her work has received positive feedback, with The New York Times calling it "exhilarating", The Boston Globe describing it as "a thrilling trip", The Washington Post praising Vigoda for "unleashing a diva-worthy torrent of passion", and Palo Alto Weekly crediting her as "truly amazing, an awesome vision of embodied musicality, moving as one with her violin, making it sing and singing along with it in a voice both smoky and angelic."

She is the lyricist and star of the musical Ernest Shackleton Loves Me, which has been produced at Emerson, George Street Playhouse in New Brunswick, and Seattle Repertory. The show went into previews off-Broadway at Second Stage on April 14 and opened May 7. She has also co-written musicals along with longtime collaborator Brendan Milburn, including Beautiful Poison, Sleeping Beauty Wakes, Striking 12, Long Story Short (musical), Midsummer, Toy Story: The Musical, and Wheelhouse. Vigoda has also co-written and contributed the music for tracks in Disney films and television shows including Tinkerbell and the Great Fairy Rescue, Pixie Hollow Games, and Secret of the Wings.

In addition to her solo career, Vigoda has toured with Cyndi Lauper, Joe Jackson, and the Trans-Siberian Orchestra.

Vigoda is an artist mentor with the "Electrify Your Strings" program, a musical education experience created to introduce and encourage young string musicians and choral singers to perform rock 'n' roll. She has taught at Stanford University, Emerson College, and the Berklee College of Music.

Discography

Albums

Singles

Awards and nominations 
Along with Brendan Milburn, Vigoda has won the Jonathan Larson Award for Excellence in Musical Theatre, the LA Ovation Award for Best Musical, and the ASCAP Richard Rodgers Award for her work. They were also nominated for a Lucille Lortel Award for Outstanding Musical (Striking 12) in 2006. Vigoda was nominated for an Annie Award in 2012 for Music in a Television Production (Pixie Hollow Games) and in 2013 for Music in an Animated Feature Production (Secret of the Wings).

References

External links 
 Val Vigoda Official Website

Year of birth missing (living people)
Living people
American women singer-songwriters
American singer-songwriters
Princeton University alumni
20th-century American singers
20th-century American women singers
20th-century American violinists
21st-century American singers
21st-century American women singers
21st-century American violinists
Women violinists